Erik Terkelsen (3 July 1926 – 1 July 2006) was a Danish footballer who competed in the 1952 Summer Olympics.

References

1926 births
2006 deaths
Association football midfielders
Danish men's footballers
Olympic footballers of Denmark
Footballers at the 1952 Summer Olympics
Esbjerg fB players